Eugenia Kempara (born September 29, 1929) was a Polish Politician (Communist).

She was a member of the Polish Council of State, making her a member of the Collective Head of State, in 1976-1985.

References

1929 births
20th-century Polish women politicians
20th-century Polish politicians
Polish communists
Living people
Place of birth missing (living people)